The phi-hiding assumption or Φ-hiding assumption is an assumption about the difficulty of finding small factors of φ(m) where m is a number whose factorization is unknown, and φ is Euler's totient function.  The security of many modern cryptosystems comes from the perceived difficulty of certain problems.  Since P vs. NP problem is still unresolved, cryptographers cannot be sure computationally intractable problems exist.  Cryptographers thus make assumptions as to which problems are hard.  It is commonly believed that if m is the product of two large primes, then calculating φ(m) is currently computationally infeasible; this assumption is required for the security of the RSA Cryptosystem.  The Φ-Hiding assumption is a stronger assumption, namely that if p1 and p2 are small primes exactly one of which divides φ(m), there is no polynomial-time algorithm which can distinguish which of the primes p1 and p2 divides φ(m) with probability significantly greater than one-half.

This assumption was first stated in the 1999 paper Computationally Private Information Retrieval with Polylogarithmic Communication, where it was used in a Private Information Retrieval scheme.

Applications
The Phi-hiding assumption has found applications in the construction of a few cryptographic primitives.  Some of the constructions include:
Computationally Private Information Retrieval with Polylogarithmic Communication (1999)
Efficient Private Bidding and Auctions with an Oblivious Third Party (1999)
Single-Database Private Information Retrieval with Constant Communication Rate (2005)
Password authenticated key exchange using hidden smooth subgroups (2005)

References

Computational number theory
Computational hardness assumptions
Theory of cryptography